The 2016 Monza GP2 Series round was a GP2 Series motor race held on 3rd and 4th September 2016 at the Autodromo Nazionale Monza in Italy. It was the ninth round of the 2016 GP2 Series. The race weekend supported the 2016 Italian Grand Prix.

Report

Qualifying
Pierre Gasly took another pole with team-mate Antonio Giovinazzi in a close second to continue the dominant form of the Prema team. However, due to irregularities in the tyre pressures, Giovinazzi was demoted toward the end of the grid, elevating third place Artem Markelov to the front row. The second row would consist of Arthur Pic and Mitch Evans.

Notes

1. – Giovinazzi and Jeffri were excluded from qualifying after being deemed to run illegal tyre pressures during the session.

Feature Race
Antonio Giovinazzi won what was a chaotic race after a mid-race accident shuffled the pack and elevated himself, Raffaele Marciello and Gustav Malja up the pack. On lap 15, an Arthur Pic collided with Sergio Canamasas through the second Lesmo. The pair were racing side-by-side and after barely leaving enough space through the corner, Pic lost control through the corner and counter-steered straight into Canamasas' rear wheel, sending him into a roll. Pic expressed frustration with the incident, although stewards later deemed him to be at fault for the incident - handing him a three-place grid penalty as a consequence. The safety car put Gasly from a comfortable first to fourth and now behind drivers on brand-new tyres. With four laps to go, it was Marciello leading from Giovinazzi and Malja. On the final lap, Giovinazzi benefited from the use of DRS and passed Marciello to take a home victory from Marciello (thereby making it an Italian one-two) and Malja. As well as this, Luca Ghiotto achieved the fastest lap, completing a successful race for the Italians on home soil.

Notes

1. – Eriksson was given a five-second penalty after having been deemed to have forced another driver off the circuit.
2. – Gelael was initially given a ten-second stop-go penalty for failing to slow under double-yellow flags, after setting his fastest sector times under the Safety Car period. After crossing the start/finish line more than twice without serving the penalty, he was disqualified from the race.

Sprint Race
Norman Nato took his first win since the opening race of the championship, beating the Prema Racing pair of Gasly and Giovinazzi with a comfortable margin.

1. – Markelov and Latifi were penalised after it was deemed that neither driver slowed sufficiently for the Virtual Safety Car. They were each given the equivalent of a drive-through-penalty (20 seconds) applied to their race times.

Standings after the round

Drivers' Championship standings

Teams' Championship standings

 Note: Only the top five positions are included for both sets of standings.

See also 
 2016 Italian Grand Prix
 2016 Monza GP3 Series round

References

External links 
 Official website of GP2 Series

GP2
GP2
Monza